= Jarrolds Valley, West Virginia =

Jarrolds Valley
- Unincorporated community
- Location within the state of West Virginia Jarrolds Valley (the United States)
- Coordinates: 37°58′30″N 81°31′44″W
- Country: United States
- State: West Virginia
- County: Raleigh
- Elevation: 1,033 ft (315 m)
- Time zone: UTC-5 (Eastern (EST))
  - Summer (DST): UTC-4 (EDT)
- GNIS ID: 1554798

Jarrolds Valley is an unincorporated community in Raleigh County, West Virginia, United States.
